19 Draconis, also known as h Draconis, is a star system in the constellation Draco. It is visible to the naked eye as a faint, yellow-white hued star with an apparent visual magnitude of 4.89. Based on its parallax, the system is located about 49.8 light-years (15.26 parsecs) away. It is moving closer to the Earth with a heliocentric radial velocity of −21 km/s.

This is a binary star system with an orbital period of 52.1 days and an eccentricity of 0.22. Only the primary star can be directly detected, via Doppler shifts or perturbations around the system's barycenter. Using spectroscopy and astrometry, the nature of the secondary star can be inferred. The primary star is an F-type main-sequence star with a stellar classification of F8V, 4% more massive than the Sun. Its surface temperature is about 6,298 K, and it emits just over twice the amount of energy that the Sun does. The secondary is only 37% as massive as the Sun, and its luminosity is only 2% that of the Sun. The system is about 4.7 billion years old.

References

Notes

F-type main-sequence stars
Solar-type stars
Spectroscopic binaries
Draco (constellation)
Draconis, h
Durchmusterung objects
Draconis, 19
0648
153597
082860
6315